This article is a list of brands under the North American packaged foods company Conagra Brands, Inc.

Conagra brands
Act II – microwave popcorn
Alexia – appetizers, artisan breads, and potato products
Andy Capp's fries – flavored corn and potato snack made to look like French fries
Angela Mia – tomato products and authentic Italian specialties
Angie's – ready to snack popcorn
 Armour Star – canned meats
 Award Cuisine – food service specialties that cross dayparts and temperature classes 
Banquet – frozen chicken and ready-to-heat meals 
 Bernstein's Dressings
Bertolli – Italian-style olive oil 
Big Mama Sausage – snack-sized preserved sausages 
BIGS – flavored sunflower seeds and pumpkin seeds
Birds Eye – frozen foods
Blue Bonnet – margarine and bread spreads 
 Brooks – beans and chili
Celeste – frozen pizza
Chef Boyardee – ready-to-eat pasta meals
Chiffon margarine – tubbed soft-margarine brand purchased from Kraft and later discontinued
Chun King – Chinese-style foods and meal packages
ConAgra Mills – multi-use flours 
Cream – corn starch
Crunch 'n Munch – glazed popcorn/nut mixture 
David Sunflower Seeds – sunflower seeds and pumpkin seeds
Dennison's – chili
Duke's – meat snacks
Duncan Hines – cake mixes
Eagle Mills with Ultragrain – all-purpose flour made with ultragrain
Egg Beaters – processed egg product
Fernando's – Mexican entrees and appetizers
Fiddle Faddle – glazed popcorn/nut mixture
Fleischmann's – bread spreads
Fraser Farm - canned meatballs with gravy
Frontera Foods-Mexican products from chef Rick Bayless
Gardein – meatless meals and snacks
Gebhardt – Tex-Mex style foods
Golden Cuisine – ready-made food for seniors
Gulden's – mustard
Healthy Choice – ready-to-eat and prepared foods
Hebrew National – kosher sausages, cold cuts and condiments 
Hungry-Man – frozen TV dinner
Hunt's – canned tomato products, ketchup and barbecue sauce
Hunt's Snack Pack – shelf-stable pudding
J. Hungerford Smith – dessert ingredients for restaurants
J.M. Swank – food ingredients 
Jiffy Pop – popcorn
Kid Cuisine – prepared foods for children
La Choy – Chinese-style foods
Lender's – frozen bagels
Lightlife – vegetarian meat product substitutes (sold in 2013)
Log Cabin Syrup
Luck's Incorporated – canned baked beans
Mama Ginellis – canned ready-to-eat pasta meals
Manwich – canned sloppy Joe mix
Margherita – Italian-style processed meats
Marie Callender's – frozen meals
The MAX – pizzeria-quality products for food service operators
Milwaukee's Pickles
Mrs. Butterworth's – pancake syrup and mixes
Mrs. Paul's – frozen seafood
Move Over Butter – margarine
Nalley – canned chili, condiments
Odom's Tennessee Pride – breakfast sausage
Open Pit – barbecue sauce
Orville Redenbacher's – popcorn
PAM – spray cooking oils
Parkay – bread spreads
Patio – Tex-Mex-style frozen meals
Pemmican – beef and turkey jerky
Penrose – pickled sausages 
Peter Pan – peanut butter
Pogo – corn dogs
Poppycock – premium glazed popcorn/nut mixture
Puritan – ready-to-eat stews
Ranch Style – baked and refried beans
Reddi-wip – whipped cream
Ro-Tel – canned tomato sauce
Rosarita – Mexican – style foods
Screaming Yellow Zonkers – glazed popcorn (discontinued)
Slim Jim – meat snacks
Smart Balance – butter, mayonnaise and cooking oil
Squeez 'N Go – prepared pudding
Swanson – frozen TV dinner
Swiss Miss – powdered cocoa for hot chocolate and pudding
Udi's Gluten Free – gluten free bread products
Van Camp's – canned beans
Van de Kamp's – frozen seafood
VH – sauces and frozen foods (available in Canada only)
Vlasic – pickles
Vogel Popcorn – popcorn
Wesson – cooking oils
Wish-Bone – salad dressing
Wolf Brand Chili – chili

See also

 List of brand name food products

References

External links
Conagra consumer brands

Lists of brands by company
Lists of brand name foods